The Koraes Professor of Modern Greek and Byzantine History, Language and Literature is a chair in the Classics Department at King's College London. It was established in 1918 to serve as a focal point in the United Kingdom and beyond for the study of Greek history and culture from the end of antiquity to the present day.

The establishment of the Koraes Chair was championed by the likes of the Anglo-Hellenic League and Eleftherios Venizelos, then Prime Minister of the Hellenic Parliament and a close friend of King's College Principal Ronald Montagu Burrows. Burrows was himself a famous classical scholar and philhellene.

The Koraes Chair is named in honour of Adamantios Koraes, the founding father of the modern Greek nation state.

List of Koraes Professor
Since its creation, there have been seven holders of the chair:

 1919–1924: Arnold J. Toynbee
 1926–1943: F. H. Marshall
 1946–1960: Romilly Jenkins
 1963–1968: Cyril Mango
 1970–1988: Donald Nicol
 1988–2018: Roderick Beaton
 2018–present: Gonda Van Steen

References

External links
 The Koraes Professor of Modern Greek and Byzantine History, Language and Literature, King's College London

Modern Greek and Byzantine History, Language and Literature, Koraes
Modern Greek and Byzantine History, Language and Literature, Koraes, King's College London
Modern Greek and Byzantine History, Language and Literature, Koraes, King's College London
Modern Greek and Byzantine History, Language and Literature, Koraes, King's College London
Greek-language education